Guichenotia sarotes is a species of flowering plant in the family Malvaceae. Flowering occurs from July to November. This guichenotia grows in a variety of soils, including sand, clay, gravel, on sloping sand plains, low hills, ridges and  near salt lakes in Western Australia.

Taxonomy and naming
Guichenotia sarotes was first formally described in 1863 by George Bentham and the description was published in Flora Australiensis.The specific epithet (sarotes) means "broom-like".

References

Byttnerioideae
Malvales of Australia
Rosids of Western Australia
Plants described in 1963